Racti Art Production & Distribution is a Lebanese dubbing and translation company, it's dubbing and translating films and TV series.

Filmography

Animated series 
 Burn! Top Striker
 A Cow, A Cat and the Ocean
 Dive Olly Dive
 Heidi
 Jeanie with the Light Brown Hair
 Lightspeed Electroid Albegas
 Little Women
 Little Women II: Jo's Boys
 Me and My Robot
 Mechakko Dotakon
 The New Adventures of Lassie
 Nouky & Friends
 Pet Alien
 Salad Juyushi Tomatoman
 Space Racers

Animated films 
 A Bug's Life (Classical Arabic version)
 Atlantis: The Lost Empire (Classical Arabic version)
 Atlantis: Milo's Return (Classical Arabic version)
 WALL-E (Classical Arabic version)

Voice actors

References

External links 

 
 

Lebanese dubbing studios
Mass media companies of Lebanon
Mass media companies established in 1998
Companies based in Beirut
Mass media in Beirut